Iridomyrmex coeruleus is a species of ant in the genus Iridomyrmex. Described in 2011, these ants are endemic to Australia and New Guinea.

References

Iridomyrmex
Hymenoptera of Australia
Insects of New Guinea
Insects described in 2011